James Walsh (28 May 1913 – 5 July 1986) was an Australian cricketer. He played fifteen first-class matches for Tasmania between 1932 and 1937.

See also
 List of Tasmanian representative cricketers

References

External links
 

1913 births
1986 deaths
Australian cricketers
Tasmania cricketers
Cricketers from Launceston, Tasmania